Chewed Corners is the ninth studio album from English electronic musician µ-Ziq. It was released in June 2013 under Planet Mu Records. It was used as µ-Ziq's set during the Bang Face 2012 weekender in Cornwall.

Track list

Rediffusion was included as a bonus with the online MP3/WAV and vinyl format release

References

2013 albums
Planet Mu albums
Mike Paradinas albums